The mayor of the City of San Diego is the official head and chief executive officer of the U.S. city of San Diego, California. The mayor has the duty to enforce and execute the laws enacted by the San Diego City Council, the legislative branch. The mayor serves a four-year term and is limited to two successive terms.

There have been 36 people who have served as mayor in San Diego since 1850, when California became a state following the American Conquest of California. Prior to the conquest, Californios served as Mayor of San Diego during the Spanish and Mexican eras since 1780. From 1852 to 1888, the city was run by a Board of Trustees and there was no elected mayor. However, the president of the board was called mayor as a courtesy.

The most recent election was held in November 2020. Todd Gloria was elected to be the 37th mayor of San Diego.

History 
The position of mayor was created when San Diego was first incorporated on March 27, 1850. However, the city went bankrupt in 1852, only two years after incorporation. As a result of the bankruptcy, the State of California dissolved the government and replaced the mayor and city council with a board of trustees.  The mayoral position was later re-established with a new charter in 1887. This charter was replaced with a permanent City Charter on May 6, 1889, using the strong mayor form of government.

In 1931, a new charter was adopted using a council–manager government with a citywide mayor as leader of the city council.

In November 2004, voters approved Proposition F, returning San Diego to the strong mayor form of government on a five-year trial basis. This was made permanent in June 2010 with the passage of Proposition D.

Scandals 
Then-mayor Roger Hedgecock was forced to resign his post in 1985, after he was found guilty of one count of conspiracy and 12 counts of perjury, related to the alleged failure to report all campaign contributions. After a series of appeals, the 12 perjury counts were dismissed in 1990 based on claims of juror misconduct; the remaining conspiracy count was reduced to a misdemeanor and then dismissed.

A 2002 scheme to underfund pensions for city employees led to the San Diego pension scandal. This resulted in the resignation of newly re-elected Mayor Dick Murphy and the criminal indictment of six pension board members. Those charges were dismissed by a federal judge in 2010.

In 2005, two city council members, Ralph Inzunza and Deputy Mayor Michael Zucchet – who briefly took over as acting mayor when Murphy resigned – were convicted of extortion, wire fraud, and conspiracy to commit wire fraud for taking campaign contributions from a strip club owner and his associates, allegedly in exchange for trying to repeal the city's "no touch" laws at strip clubs. Both subsequently resigned. Inzunza was sentenced to 21 months in prison. In 2009, a judge acquitted Zucchet on seven out of the nine counts against him, and granted his petition for a new trial on the other two charges; the remaining charges were eventually dropped.

In July 2013, three former supporters of mayor Bob Filner asked him to resign because of allegations of repeated sexual harassment. Over the ensuing six weeks, 18 women came forward to publicly claim that Filner had sexually harassed them, and multiple individuals and groups called for him to resign. Filner agreed to resign effective August 30, 2013, subsequently pleaded guilty to one felony count of false imprisonment and two misdemeanor battery charges, and was sentenced to house arrest and probation.

Duties and powers 
The mayor serves as the official head of the City of San Diego for all ceremonial and civil purposes.  The mayor has the authority to approve or veto council actions, subject to a two-thirds vote veto overrule. Under the strong mayor system, the mayor has sole authority to appoint and dismiss the city manager and to direct and control the city manager as permitted by the city charter. The mayor also has the authority to dismiss the chief of police or the chief of the fire department subject to a council overrule. The mayor may recommend measures and ordinance to the city council, but may not vote on these items.

On or before January 15, the mayor is obligated to communicate a State of the City address to the city council. The mayor must also propose a budget to the city council and for public review no later than April 15.

The salary of the mayor was set at $100,464 in 2003. In March 2012, the city's Salary Setting Commission proposed that the mayor be paid $235,000, but the city council unanimously rejected the recommendation, instead keeping the salary at the 2003 level. In March 2014, the Salary Setting Commission recommended no pay increase for the mayor or city council. Instead, they recommended exploring future pay increases with additional condition that council members voting for pay increases not be allowed to benefit from the increase. This recommendation was approved by the city council in a 5–3 vote in favor of the changes. In November 2018, voters passed Measure L which ties future mayoral salaries to those of Superior Court judges. As of December 2020, the mayoral salary is $206,000.

Election and succession 
The mayor is elected in citywide election. Elections follow a two-round system. The first round of the election is called the primary election. The top-two candidates from the primary election advance to a runoff election, called the general election. Write-in candidates are only allowed to contest the primary election and are not allowed in the general election. The mayor is elected to a four-year term, with a limit of two consecutive terms. The mayor is officially non-partisan by state law, although most mayoral candidates identify a party preference.

If the office of the mayor becomes vacant with one year or less remaining in the term, the city council appoints a person to fill the vacancy. If the vacancy occurs with more than one year remaining, the city council is obligated to call a special election. The candidate with the majority of the votes in the special election is declared mayor. If no candidate receives a majority, a special run-off must be held between the two candidates with the highest number of votes. While the mayor's office is vacant pending a special election, the president of the city council serves as the interim mayor, with limited powers, until a new mayor is elected. If for any reason a Mayor serves a partial term of two years or more, it will count as one full term.

The most recent election was held in November 2020. Todd Gloria was elected to be the 37th mayor of San Diego, succeeding the termed out Kevin Faulconer. Gloria had previously served as interim mayor in his role as city council president following the 2013 resignation of Bob Filner.

List 

There have been 37 mayoralties because Edwin M. Capps served two non-consecutive terms; he is counted chronologically as both the ninth and sixteenth mayor. The longest term was that of Pete Wilson, who served for eleven years over three terms prior to the establishment of successive term limits. The shortest term, not counting interim or acting mayors, was that of George P. Tebbetts, who served for less than two months before the position of mayor was abolished due to the bankruptcy of the city. Percy J. Benbough is the only mayor to have died in office. Two women have been elected mayor: Maureen O'Connor and Susan Golding consecutively. John F. Forward Sr. and John F. Forward Jr. are the only father and son to have both served as mayor. Todd Gloria is the first mayor of color, with Filipino, Latino, and Native American heritage. Gloria is also the first elected mayor to be openly gay.

This list includes people who served as acting mayor or interim mayor due to a vacancy in the office of the mayor, but who were not officially elected or appointed as mayor. The acting and interim mayors are not included in the count of mayoralties.

Presidents of the Board of Trustees 
After San Diego's bankruptcy in 1852, the State of California took over city government and ran the city with an appointed Board of Trustees during 1852–1888. The President of the Board was called mayor by courtesy, although there was no official office of mayor. When the office of president was vacated due to death or resignation, the board of trustees would choose a president pro tempore to preside over meetings until a permanent president could be elected by the board.

Notes and references

Notes 

 Party affiliation is shown for each mayor, when known. However, election of mayor under the current charter is officially nonpartisan.
 From 1852 until 1888, San Diego was governed by a board of trustees, so there was no official mayor.
 William Jefferson Hunsaker resigned from office, likely due to frustration from losing a power struggle against rivals on the city council. Martin D. Hamilton served as acting mayor until the next election could be held. 
 Both acting mayor Martin D. Hamilton and fourth mayor Douglas Gunn ran as Republicans on the "Citizens' Non-Partisan" ticket. 
 John F. Forward Jr. resigned from office after failing in his attempt to fire the city manager.  Rutherford B. Irones was appointed to finish the balance of his term. However, Irones himself would later resign after being convicted of drunk driving and a hit-and-run traffic accident. Vice mayor Albert W. Bennett then served as acting mayor until a new election could be held. 
 Percy J. Benbough died in office of natural causes. Vice mayor Fred W. Simpson then served briefly as acting mayor until Howard B. Bard was appointed to finish the balance of Benbough's term. 
 Pete Wilson resigned from office to join the United States Senate. Bill Cleator served as acting mayor until a new election could be held. 
 Roger Hedgecock resigned from office due to convictions on felony conspiracy and perjury charges that were later overturned. Ed Struiksma served as acting mayor until a new election could be held. 
 Dick Murphy resigned from office amid criticism for his role in the San Diego pension scandal and after failing to win a majority of the votes in the 2004 election. Michael Zucchet served as acting mayor for three days before he too resigned due to a corruption conviction that was later overturned. A week later, the City Council elected Toni Atkins to serve as acting mayor until a new election could be held. 
 Bob Filner resigned from office amid multiple allegations of sexual harassment. Todd Gloria served as interim mayor until a new mayor was elected.

References

External links 

 
 Election results
 City Charter 1889–1931
 City Charter 1931–2004

 
San Diego, California

Mayors of San Diego
1850 establishments in California